Moataz Bostami (Arabic:معتز البسطامي) (born 16 May 1996) is a Qatari born-Jordanian footballer. He currently plays as a midfielder for Qatar.

Career

Qatar SC
Bostami started his career at Qatar SC and is a product of the Qatar's youth system. On 24 November 2013, Bostami made his professional debut for Qatar SC against Al-Rayyan in the Pro League, replacing Khaled Al-Ansari . He landed with Qatar SC from the Qatar Stars League to the Qatari Second Division in 2015-16 season . And ent up with Qatar SC from the Qatari Second Division to the Qatar Stars League in the 2016-17 season .

Al-Kharaitiyat
On 9 August 2018, left Qatar SC and return with Al-Kharaitiyat on loan of season |. On 12 August 2018, Bostami made his professional debut for Al-Kharaitiyat against Al-Shahania in the Pro League .

Personal life
Moatasem is the Brother of the footballer Motasem Al Bustami.

External links

References

Living people
1996 births
Qatari footballers
Qatari people of Jordanian descent
Naturalised citizens of Qatar
Qatar SC players
Al Kharaitiyat SC players
Qatar Stars League players
Qatari Second Division players
Association football midfielders
Place of birth missing (living people)